Brian Dunphy (born 17 June 1974, Dublin, Ireland) is an Irish folk singer and son of the showband singer Sean Dunphy, who represented Ireland at the Eurovision Song Contest in 1967. As a performer and member of the Irish folk band The High Kings, Brian Dunphy has toured the United States, Ireland and the United Kingdom. He got his start as the lead singer in Riverdance: The Show, which ran on Broadway in New York City. He also joined the Three Irish Tenors, who toured throughout the United States, and was also part of the band Druid. He released a solo album entitled Timeless in 2005. Dunphy later became a member of the four-person Irish folk band The High Kings (2008–present), along with Finbarr Clancy and Martin Furey. The High Kings have released six albums and toured in the United States, Europe and Australia. Dunphy typically plays the bodhrán and the guitar in the group.

References

1974 births
Living people
Irish folk singers
Musicians from Dublin (city)
Irish male guitarists
21st-century Irish male singers
21st-century guitarists